Hammondsville is an unincorporated community in central Saline Township, Jefferson County, Ohio, United States. It is part of the Weirton-Steubenville metropolitan area. It lies along Ohio State Route 213.

History
Hammondsville was laid out in 1852 and named for Charles Hammond, the original owner of the town site. A post office has been in operation at Hammondsville since 1852. Hammondsville was originally a mining community and the Hammondsville Mining and Coal Company operated there.

Education
Hammondsville is part of the Edison Local School District. Campuses serving the community include Stanton Elementary School (Preschool-Grade 8) and Edison High School  (Grades 9-12).

Notable people
 Bevo Francis, basketball player, one of the most prolific scorers in college basketball history

References

Unincorporated communities in Jefferson County, Ohio
Unincorporated communities in Ohio